The 2019 Nebraska Cornhuskers football team represented the University of Nebraska in the 2019 NCAA Division I FBS football season. The team was coached by second-year head coach Scott Frost and played their home games at Memorial Stadium in Lincoln, Nebraska. They were members of the West Division of the Big Ten Conference. They finished the season 5–7, 3–6 in Big Ten play to finish in a tie for fifth place in the West Division.

Previous season
The Cornhuskers finished the 2018 season 4–8 and 3–6 in Big Ten conference play, a tie for a fifth-place finish in the West Division. The 2018 team was coached by first-year head coach Scott Frost, who came back to his alma mater after leading UCF for two seasons prior.

Offseason

Recruiting

Position key

Recruits
The Cornhuskers signed a total of 24 scholarship recruits during the Early Signing Period on December 19, 2018.

Scholarship recruits

Walk-on recruits

Transfers

Outgoing

Incoming

Spring scrimmage

Preseason

Award watch lists
Listed in the order that they were released

Preseason Big Ten poll
Although the Big Ten Conference has not held an official preseason poll since 2010, Cleveland.com has polled sports journalists representing all member schools as a de facto preseason media poll since 2011. In the 2019 poll, Nebraska was projected to win the West Division.

Schedule
The 2019 schedule consisted of seven home and five away games in the regular season. Nebraska hosted conference foes Ohio State, Northwestern, Indiana, Wisconsin and Iowa and the Cornhuskers traveled to play Illinois, Minnesota, Purdue and Maryland in Big Ten play.

Roster and coaching staff

Depth chart

Game summaries

South Alabama

Sources:

South Alabama Game starters

at Colorado

Sources:

Colorado Game starters

Northern Illinois

Sources:

North Illinois Game starters

at Illinois

Sources:

Nebraska trailed for most of the game, then came back to beat Illinois 42–38.  With the victory, the Huskers got their first road win under Scott Frost and their 900th overall win in program history.

Illinois Game starters

Ohio State

Sources:

Ohio State Game starters

Northwestern

Sources:

Northwestern Game starters

at Minnesota

Sources:

Minnesota Game starters

Indiana

Sources:

Indiana Game starters

at Purdue

Purdue Game starters

Wisconsin

Sources:

Wisconsin Game starters

at Maryland

Sources:

Maryland Game starters

Iowa

Sources:

Iowa Game starters

Big Ten Awards

Player of the Week Honors

All-Conference Awards

2019 Big Ten All-Conference Teams and Awards

Rankings

Players drafted into the NFL

References

Nebraska
Nebraska Cornhuskers football seasons
Nebraska Cornhuskers football